Russian Village may refer to:

in Russia
For general information about villages in Russia, see types of inhabited localities in Russia

in the United States
Russian Village Historic District, listed on the National Register of Historic Places in Connecticut
Russian Village District, listed on the National Register of Historic Places in California